(born 19 June 1983 in Tokyo, Japan) is a Japanese rugby union player. Aoki has played 28 matches for the Japan national rugby union team. Aoki was a member of the Japan team at the 2011 Rugby World Cup, where he played one match. Aoki currently plays for Top League team Suntory Sungoliath. He started with the club in 2006.

References

Living people
1983 births
Japanese rugby union players
Tokyo Sungoliath players
Rugby union locks
Japan international rugby union players